Eulima tristis is a species of sea snail, a marine gastropod mollusk in the family Eulimidae. The species is one of a number within the genus Eulima.

References

tristis
Gastropods described in 1925